Karl Rönisch is a piano manufacturer in Dresden, Germany.

The owner Karl Moritz Hermann Rönisch was awarded an imperial and royal warrant of appointment to the court of Austria-Hungary.

The company exported to Russia and, to avoid high tariffs, built a factory in St. Petersburg in 1897, parts for which were still manufactured in Dresden, in the main factory. In 1918, Hermann Rönisch, the son of the company's founder, sold the "Carl Rönisch Hof-Pianofabrik" to Ludwig Hupfeld AG in Leipzig after his grandson, who had been designated as his successor, had been killed in the First World War. He had been associated with Ludwig Hupfeld as a business partner since 1902.

In 2009, the company merged with Blüthner and the production was moved to Blüthner factory in Leipzig, Germany. In 1945, most of Rönisch's main factory in Dresden's Innere Neustadt fell victim to the air raids on Dresden. Since 1948, instruments bearing the Rönisch brand name have been built at the "Leipziger Pianofortefabrik", the main factory of Ludwig Hupfeld AG in the Böhlitz-Ehrenberg district of Leipzig.

Current grand piano models

Current upright piano models

References

External links 
 Official homepage of Karl Rönisch

Manufacturing companies based in Dresden
Piano manufacturing companies of Germany
Purveyors to the Imperial and Royal Court
Piano makers
German brands